Morony is a surname. It may refer to:

Francis Goold Morony Stoney, Irish engineer
John G. Morony, a banker, after whom the Morony Dam is named
Michael G. Morony, American historian
Thomas Morony, Master Gunner, St. James's Park, 1983-1988

See also
Moroney (disambiguation)
Maroney (disambiguation)
Moroni (disambiguation)